Jean-Pierre-Louis de Luchet (1740–1792), also known as the Marquis de La Roche du Maine, or Marquis de Luchet, was a French journalist, essayist, and theatre manager.

Life 
Luchet held salons under the name of Marquis de La Roche, and was part of the Garde ordinaire du Roi, where he met André-Robert Andréa de Nerciat, who joined in 1771. Thereafter, he took the name of Jean-Pierre Luchet, Knight of St Louis. With Neciat he shone at the court of Frederick II. Neciat, attracted to the court of Hesse-Cassel by Luchet, who sought new parts for the Landgrave, towards the end of 1779 he proposed that Luchet did a comic opera, Constance ou l'heureuse témérité, which is preserved at the Stuttgart Library.

Theories 
In 1789, de Luchet published his Essai sur la Secte des Illuminés, in which he denounced the leaders of the Bavarian Illuminati, whom he accused of controlling Freemasonry, generally in Europe, and specifically in France.

Works 

 Essais sur la minéralogie et la métallurgie (Jean-Edme Dufour & Philippe Roux ..., 1779)
 Les Contemporains de 1789 et 1790, ou, Les opinions débattues pendant la première législature (Lejay fils ..., 1790)
 Histoire de Messieurs Paris (1776)
 Mémoires de madame la duchesse de Morsheim (Impr. de Wilson, 1787)
 Essais sur la minéralogie et la métallurgie (Jean-Edme Dufour & Philippe Roux, 1779)
 Analyse raisonnée de la sagesse de Charron (1789).
 Une seule faute (1788)
 Essai sur la secte des Illuminés (1789)
 La Galerie des dames françoises, pour servir de suite à la galerie des états-généraux, par le même auteur. Troisième partie (1790)
 Considérations politiques et historiques sur l'établissement de la religion prétendue reformée en Angleterre (Paris: Panckoucke, 1765) [microform].
 Paris en miniature d'après les dessins d'un nouvel argus (Pichard, 1994)
 Le Vicomte de Barjac (« De l'imprimerie de Wilson, et se trouve à Paris, chez les libraires qui vendent des nouveautés 1784
 Analyse Raisonnée de la Sagesse de Charron 2 vols. (Amsterdam: Marc-Michel Rey, 1763).

References 

1740 births
1792 deaths